In enzymology, a glycerol-3-phosphate O-acyltransferase is an enzyme that catalyzes the chemical reaction

acyl-CoA + sn-glycerol 3-phosphate  CoA + 1-acyl-sn-glycerol 3-phosphate

Thus, the two substrates of this enzyme are acyl-CoA and sn-glycerol 3-phosphate, whereas its two products are CoA and 1-acyl-sn-glycerol 3-phosphate.

This enzyme belongs to the family of transferases, specifically those acyltransferases transferring groups other than aminoacyl groups.  The systematic name of this enzyme class is acyl-CoA:sn-glycerol-3-phosphate 1-O-acyltransferase. Other names in common use include alpha-glycerophosphate acyltransferase, 3-glycerophosphate acyltransferase, ACP:sn-glycerol-3-phosphate acyltransferase, glycerol 3-phosphate acyltransferase, glycerol phosphate acyltransferase, glycerol phosphate transacylase, glycerophosphate acyltransferase, glycerophosphate transacylase, sn-glycerol 3-phosphate acyltransferase, and sn-glycerol-3-phosphate acyltransferase.  This enzyme participates in glycerolipid metabolism and glycerophospholipid metabolism. The later pathways in human is part of the WikiPathways machine readable pathway collection.

Structural studies

Currently 4 different proteins are assigned to this reaction, GPAT1, GPAT2, GPAT3 and GPAT4. GPAT1 and 2 are considered mitochondrial proteins.

References

 
 
 
 

EC 2.3.1
Enzymes of known structure